Matthew William Bradley (born June 13, 1978) is a Canadian professional ice hockey scout and former  player. He currently is a scout for the Washington Capitals.  Bradley played in the National Hockey League for the San Jose Sharks, Pittsburgh Penguins, Washington Capitals and the Florida Panthers. He began working with the Washington Capitals as part of their scouting staff in 2015.

Playing career
Bradley grew up in the Ottawa suburb of Stittsville, Ontario, and played most of his minor hockey for the local Stittsville Rams "C" teams as well as AA for the Ottawa Valley Titans of the ODHA.

After a solid Bantam season in 1993–94 with the Titans, Bradley was drafted and signed with the Cumberland Grads of the Central Junior Hockey League (CJHL).  He spent the 1994–95 season with the Grads before being selected in the 2nd round (31st overall) of the 1995 OHL Priority Selection by the Kingston Frontenacs.

Bradley was drafted by the San Jose Sharks in the 1996 NHL Entry Draft, in the fourth round, 102nd overall. Prior to signing with the Washington Capitals, he also played for the Pittsburgh Penguins and San Jose Sharks.

Though he was not an offensive powerhouse, Bradley effectively carved out a niche for himself as a tough, checking line winger.  In the 2007–08 season, Bradley doubled his fight total from the previous year, had a career-high 111 shots on goal, and was third among Capitals forwards in hits, even though he had the second lowest amount of ice time.  Bradley improved his plus/minus rating in every season from 2003 to 2008.

Bradley was re-signed by the Capitals on May 27, 2008, to a three-year contract at $1,000,000 per season.

On July 3, 2011, Bradley signed a two-year, one-way contract with the Florida Panthers. In the 2011–12 season, Bradley appeared in only 45 games, his lowest since his rookie season, recording 8 points. With a limited role and dwindling future prospects in June 2012, the Panthers placed Bradley on waivers and subsequently bought out the remaining year on his contract.

With the 2012 NHL lockout in effect, and with limited interest, Bradley signed a month-by-month contract with Finnish second-division club TuTo Hockey on October 29, 2012. After just one game with TuTo, Bradley suffered another concussion and opted to end his agreement and return to Canada for rehabilitation on November 5, 2012.

Career statistics

Regular season and playoffs

International

Awards and honours

References

External links
 

1978 births
Living people
Canadian ice hockey forwards
Dornbirn Bulldogs players
Florida Panthers players
Ice hockey people from Ottawa
Kentucky Thoroughblades players
Kingston Frontenacs players
Pittsburgh Penguins players
San Jose Sharks draft picks
San Jose Sharks players
TuTo players
Washington Capitals players
Canadian expatriate ice hockey players in Austria
Canadian expatriate ice hockey players in Finland